Ritter Island is a small crescent-shaped volcanic island  north-east of New Guinea, situated between Umboi Island and Sakar Island.

There are several recorded eruptions of this basaltic-andesitic stratovolcano prior to a spectacular lateral collapse which took place in 1888.

1888 eruption 

At about 5:30 am local time on 13 March 1888 a large portion of the island, containing perhaps  of material slid into the sea during a relatively minor, possibly VEI 2, phreatic eruption. Eyewitnesses at Finschhafen,  to the south, heard explosions and observed an almost imperceptible ash fall.

At least two small eruptions have occurred offshore since 1888, one in 1972 and another in 1974, which have resulted in the construction of a small submarine edifice within the collapse scar.

See also
 List of volcanic eruption deaths
 List of volcanoes in Papua New Guinea

References

Islands of Papua New Guinea
Subduction volcanoes
Active volcanoes
Stratovolcanoes of Papua New Guinea
Holocene stratovolcanoes